Alushta Sea Commercial Port is an unrealized project, a commercial sea port in the city of Alushta, on the Black Sea coast of Crimea. The port of Alushta is actually a very small port in Ukraine. Plans for its expansion existed in the USSR.

See also

List of ports in Ukraine
Transport in Ukraine
Cargo turnover of Ukrainian ports

References

Alushta
Buildings and structures in Crimea
Ports of Crimea